Arlauskas may refer to:

 Andrius Arlauskas (born 1986), a Lithuanian football midfielder
 Mykolas Arlauskas (born 1930, near Liepāja, Latvia), a Latvia-born Lithuanian agronomist, professor of biomedicine
 Romanas Arlauskas (born 1917, Kaunas, Lithuania), a Lithuanian-born Australian chess master
 Ramunė Arlauskienė (born 1973), a Lithuanian female mountain bike orienteer

Lithuanian-language surnames